Dragnet was an American radio series, enacting the cases of a dedicated Los Angeles police detective, Sergeant Joe Friday, and his partners. The show took its name from the police term "dragnet", meaning a system of coordinated measures for apprehending criminals or suspects.

Dragnet is perhaps the most famous and influential  police procedural drama in media history. The series gave audience members a feel for the boredom and drudgery, as well as the danger and heroism, of police work. Dragnet earned praise for improving the public opinion of police officers.

Actor and producer Jack Webb's aims in Dragnet were for realism and unpretentious acting. He achieved both goals, and Dragnet  remains a key influence on subsequent police dramas in many media.

The show's cultural impact is such that after seven decades, elements of Dragnet are familiar to those who have never seen or heard the program. The ominous, four-note introduction to the brass and tympani theme music (titled "Danger Ahead"), composed by Walter Schumann, is instantly recognizable.  It is derived from Miklós Rózsa's score for the 1946 film version of The Killers. Another Dragnet trademark is the show's opening narration: "Ladies and gentlemen: the story you are about to hear is true. Only the names have been changed to protect the innocent." This underwent minor revisions over time. The "only" and "ladies and gentlemen" were dropped at some point. Variations on this narration have been featured in subsequent crime dramas, and in parodies of the dramas (e.g. "Only the facts have been changed to protect the guilty").

The radio series was the first entry in a Dragnet media franchise encompassing film, television, books and comics.

History and creation
Dragnet was created and produced by Jack Webb, who starred as stoic Sergeant Joe Friday.  Webb had starred in a few mostly short-lived radio programs, and Dragnet would make him a major media personality in his era.

Dragnet origins were in Webb's small role as a police forensic scientist in the 1948 film He Walked by Night, itself inspired by the violent 1946 crime spree of Erwin Walker, a disturbed World War II veteran and former Glendale, California, police department employee.  The film was depicted in semidocumentary style, and Marty Wynn (an LAPD sergeant from the Robbery Division) was a technical advisor on the film.  Inspired by Wynn's accounts of actual cases and criminal investigative procedure, Webb convinced Wynn that day-to-day activities of police officers could be realistically depicted in a broadcast series, without the forced melodrama heard in the numerous private-detective serials then common in radio programming. (The film contained two elements that would transfer over to the Dragnet television series: the opening text overlay containing the phrase mentioning that the story is true and "only the names are changed—to protect the innocent", which was then immediately followed by various shots of Los Angeles with a narrator beginning with the phrase "This is the city.  Los Angeles, California.")

Webb frequently visited police headquarters, rode along on night patrols with Sgt. Wynn and his partner Officer Vance Brasher, and attended Police Academy courses to learn authentic jargon and details that could be featured in a radio program. When he proposed Dragnet to NBC officials, they were not especially impressed; radio was aswarm with private investigators and crime dramas, such as Webb's earlier Pat Novak for Hire. That program didn't last long, but Webb received high marks for his role as the titular private investigator, and NBC agreed to a limited run for Dragnet.

With writer James E. Moser, Webb prepared an audition recording, then sought the LAPD's endorsement; he wanted to portray cases from official files to demonstrate the steps taken by police officers during investigations. The official response was initially lukewarm, but in 1949 LAPD Chief Clemence B. Horrall gave Webb the endorsement he sought. Police wanted control over the program's sponsor, and insisted that police not be depicted unflatteringly. This would lead to  criticism, as less flattering departmental aspects, such as LAPD's racial segregation policies, were never addressed.

Premiere

Dragnet debuted inauspiciously. The early months were bumpy, as the program was sustaining (as yet unable to attract a sponsor) and the budget was limited, forcing Webb to employ relatively few radio actors per episode. The network originally stressed a shrill, strident tone as popularized on rival show Gang Busters (the earliest Dragnet episodes mimic the Gang Busters opening, with an announcer shouting "Draaaaag...net!"). Webb put a stop to this after only a few episodes, with a different announcer adopting a more neutral delivery. Webb also discovered how versatile his actors were, and kept them on hand week after week. Barton Yarborough was there for every episode as Webb's partner, with character roles played variously by Harry Bartell, Vic Perrin, Virginia Gregg, Herb Butterfield, Jack Kruschen, Peggy Webber, Herb Ellis, Barney Phillips, and Clarence Cassell. All of these radio performers remained with Dragnet when it became a television series. During the radio show's first year, Raymond Burr was on board to play chief of detectives Ed Backstrand.

Jack Webb and company worked out the format and eventually grew somewhat comfortable with their characters (Friday was originally portrayed as more brash and forceful than his later, usually flat demeanor). Gradually, Friday's deadpan, fast-talking persona emerged, described by John Dunning as "a cop's cop, tough but not hard, conservative but caring." Friday's first partner was Sergeant Ben Romero, portrayed by Barton Yarborough, a longtime radio actor. After Yarborough's death in 1951 (and therefore Romero's, who died of a heart attack on the December 27, 1951 episode "The Big Sorrow"), Friday was partnered with Sergeant Ed Jacobs (December 27, 1951 – April 10, 1952, subsequently transferred to the police academy as an instructor), played by Barney Phillips; Officer Bill Lockwood (Ben Romero's nephew, April 17, 1952 – May 8, 1952), played by Martin Milner (with Ken Peters taking the role for the June 12, 1952 episode "The Big Donation"); and finally Frank Smith (introduced in "The Big Safe", May 1, 1952), played originally by Herb Ellis (1952), then Ben Alexander (1952–1959). Alexander would reprise the role of Smith for the initial television version and the 1954 film, making him Friday's longest-serving partner in all the franchise's media.

When Dragnet hit its stride, it was one of radio's top-rated shows. Webb insisted on realism. The dialogue was clipped, understated, and sparse, influenced by the hardboiled school of crime fiction. Scripts were fast-moving but did not seem rushed. Every aspect of police work was chronicled, step by step: from patrols and paperwork, to crime scene investigation, lab work, and questioning witnesses or suspects. The detectives’ personal lives rarely took center stage. (Friday was a bachelor who lived with his mother; Romero, a Mexican-American from Texas, was an ever-fretful husband and father.) "Underplaying is still acting", Webb told Time. "We try to make it as real as a guy pouring a cup of coffee." Los Angeles police chiefs Clemence B. Horrall, William A. Worton, and (later) William H. Parker were credited as consultants, and many police officers were fans.

Most later episodes were entitled "The Big _", where the key word denoted a person or object in the plot. In numerous episodes, this would be the principal suspect, victim, or physical target of the crime, but in others was often a seemingly inconsequential detail eventually revealed as key evidence in solving the crime. For example, in "The Big Streetcar" the background noise of a passing streetcar helps establish the location of a phone booth used by the suspect.

Throughout the series' radio years, one can find glimpses of pre-renewal Downtown L.A., with working-class residents and the cheap bars, cafes, hotels, and boarding houses that served them. At the climax of the early episode "James Vickers" (September 17, 1949), the chase leads to the Subway Terminal Building, where the robber flees into a tunnel—only to be killed by an oncoming train. By contrast, in episodes set in outlying areas, it is clear that the locations are far less built up than they are today. Today, the Imperial Highway, extending 40 miles east from El Segundo to Anaheim, is a heavily used boulevard lined with low-rise commercial development. In the episode "The Big Chance" (February 4, 1954) scenes along the Highway, at "the road to San Pedro," clearly indicate that it retained much of the character of a country highway at that time.

Verisimilitude
Webb was a stickler for accurate details, and Dragnet used authentic touches, such as the LAPD's actual radio call sign (KMA367), and the names of actual department officials, such as Ray Pinker and Lee Jones of the crime lab or Chief of Detectives (and later LAPD Chief from 1967 to 1969) Thad Brown.

Two announcers were used.  Episodes began with announcer George Fenneman intoning the series opening ("The story you are about to hear is true; only the names have been changed to protect the innocent.") and Hal Gibney describing the premise of the episode. "Big Saint" (April 26, 1951) for example, begins with "You're a detective sergeant. You're assigned to auto theft detail. A well organized ring of car thieves begins operations in your city. It's one of the most puzzling cases you've ever encountered. Your job: break it."

After the first commercial, Gibney would officially introduce the program: "Dragnet, the documented drama of an actual crime. For the next thirty minutes, in cooperation with the Los Angeles Police Department, you will travel step-by-step on the side of the law through an actual case transcribed from official police files. From beginning to end—from crime to punishment—Dragnet is the story of your police force in action." The earliest episodes had an elaborate preamble: "Dragnet, the documented drama of an actual crime, investigated and solved by the men who unrelentingly stand watch on the security of your home, your family and your life," followed by the standard opening.

The story usually began with footsteps, followed by Joe Friday reporting the date and the local weather conditions, followed by the assignment of the day: "We were working the day watch out of Robbery Division. My partner's Ben Romero. The boss is Ed Backstrand, chief of detectives. My name's Friday." Friday would then narrate where he or both he and his partner were going, then the time he/they arrived at the location followed by a door opening and an elaboration of the location: "I was on my way in to work, and it was 4:58 PM when I got to Room 42 ... (door opening) Homicide." ("The Big String", January 18, 1953)

Friday offered voice-over narration throughout the episodes, noting the time, date and place of every scene as he and his partners went through their day investigating the crime. The events related in a given episode might occur in hours, or might span a few months. At least one episode unfolded in real time: in "City Hall Bombing" (July 21, 1949), Friday and Romero had less than thirty minutes to stop a man who was threatening to destroy the City Hall with a bomb. In one episode, "The Big Ben" (March 15, 1951), after Friday was shot and hospitalized Romero took over the voice-over narration for the remainder of the episode.

At the end of the episode, usually after a brief endorsement by Jack Webb for the sponsor's product, announcer Hal Gibney would relate the fate of the suspect, usually tried in "Department 187 of the Superior Court of the State of California, in and for the City and County of Los Angeles", convicted of a crime and sent (in most episodes) to "the State Penitentiary, San Quentin California" or "examined by [#] psychiatrists appointed by the court", judged mentally incompetent and "committed to a state mental hospital for an indefinite period".  Murderers were often "executed in the manner prescribed by law" or "executed in the lethal gas chamber at the State Penitentiary, San Quentin California". Occasionally, police pursued the wrong suspect, and criminals sometimes avoided justice or escaped, at least on the radio Dragnet. In 1950, Time quoted Webb: "We don’t even try to prove that crime doesn’t pay ... sometimes it does."

Specialized terminology was mentioned in every episode but rarely explained. Webb trusted the audience to determine the meanings of words or terms by their context, and Dragnet tried to avoid awkward, lengthy exposition that people would not use in daily speech. Some specialized terms such as "A.P.B." for "All Points Bulletin" and "M.O." for "Modus Operandi" were rarely used in popular culture before Dragnet introduced them to everyday America.

While most radio shows used one or two sound-effect experts, Dragnet used five: a script clocking in at just under 30 minutes could require up to 300 effects. Accuracy was underlined: The exact number of footsteps from one room to another at Los Angeles police headquarters were mimicked, and when a telephone rang at Friday's desk, the listener heard the same ring as the telephones in Los Angeles police headquarters. A single minute of ".22 Rifle for Christmas" is a representative example of the evocative sound effects featured on Dragnet. While Friday and others investigate bloodstains in a suburban backyard,  the listener hears a series of overlapping effects: a squeaking gate hinge, footsteps, a technician scraping blood into a paper envelope, the glassy chime of chemical vials, bird calls, and a dog barking in the distance.

Sometimes the mundane intruded. When shows ran short, directors stalled for time. In "The Big Crime", Dragnet interrupted a scene while a real-estate agent spent a full minute answering and explaining a phone call, simply filling in time.

The earliest radio programs ended each week with a remembrance  of fallen officers who died on the job. The remembrance would be read over somber organ music, and would be officers from all over the country. This remembrance was eventually phased out.

Topics and themes
Scripts tackled topics ranging from the thrilling (murders, missing persons and armed robbery) to the mundane (check fraud and shoplifting), yet Dragnet made them all interesting due to fast-moving plots and behind-the-scenes realism. In "The Garbage Chute" (December 15, 1949), they even had a locked room mystery.

Though tame by modern standards, Dragnet—especially on the radio—handled controversial subjects such as sex crimes and drug addiction with unprecedented and even startling realism.  In one such example, Dragnet broke an unspoken (and rarely broached) taboos of popular entertainment in the episode ".22 Rifle for Christmas" which aired December 22, 1949 and repeated at Christmastime for the next three years. The episode followed the search for two young boys, Stanley Johnstone and Stevie Morheim, only to discover Stevie had been accidentally killed while playing with a rifle that belonged to Stanleywho was supposed to receive it as a Christmas present but opened the box early. Stanley finally told Friday that Stevie had been running while holding the rifle when he tripped and fell, causing the gun to discharge, fatally wounding Morheim. NBC received thousands of letters, most of which were positive, according to the book " My Name's Friday". There was a protest by the National Rifle Association. Webb forwarded their letter over to police chief Parker who promised "ten more shows illustrating the folly of giving rifles to children".

".22 Rifle for Christmas" was replaced as the series' Christmas story on December 22, 1953 with "The Big Little Jesus", which followed the detectives' investigation of the theft of a statue of the baby Jesus from a church Nativity scene. With its happier ending than ".22 Rifle", this episode was repeated at Christmastime the following year. The late-1960s TV version of Dragnet included a newly produced version of "The Big Little Jesus", which featured Barry Williams (later of The Brady Bunch) as one of the altar boys.

Another episode dealt with high school girls who, rather than finding Hollywood stardom, fall in with fraudulent talent scouts and end up in pornography and prostitution. Both this episode and ".22 Rifle for Christmas" were adapted for television, with few script changes, when Dragnet moved to that medium. An episode, "The Big Trio" (July 3, 1952), detailed three cases in one episode, including reckless and dangerous (in this case, fatal) driving by unlicensed juveniles. With regard to drugs, Webb's strident anti-drug statements, continuing through the TV run, would be derided as camp by later audiences; yet his character later showed concern and sympathy for addicts as victims, especially in the case of juveniles.

The tone was usually serious, but with moments of comic relief: Romero was something of a hypochondriac and often seemed henpecked; Frank Smith continually complained about his brother-in-law Armand; though Friday dated, he usually dodged women who tried to set him up with marriage-minded dates.

Due in part to Webb's fondness for radio drama, Dragnet persisted on radio until 1957 (the last two seasons were repeats) as one of the last old time radio shows to give way to television's growing popularity. A total of 314 original episodes were broadcast from 1949 through 1957. In fact, the TV show proved to be a visual version of the radio show, as the style was virtually the same [including the scripts, as the majority were adapted from radio]. The TV show could be listened to without watching, with no loss of understanding of the storyline.

The radio show was also adapted into a comic strip by Mel Keefer.

"Just the facts, ma'am"
While "Just the facts, ma'am" is known as Dragnet'''s catchphrase (it has been parodied many times by other productions), that precise phrase was never actually uttered by Joe Friday. The closest lines were "All we want are the facts, ma'am" and "All we know are the facts, ma'am".  The "Just the facts, ma'am" phrase did appear in the parody St. George and the Dragonet, a 1953 short audio satire by Stan Freberg. The phrase was spoken by Ben Alexander in a 1966 cameo appearance on Batman. The phrase was used in the film L.A. Confidential, a reference to Badge of Honor, a fictitious TV show similar to Dragnet.

Main cast
 Jack Webb as Los Angeles Police Department (L.A.P.D) Detective Sergeant Joseph "Joe" Friday
 Barton Yarborough as  Friday's partner, Los Angeles Police Department (L.A.P.D) Sergeant Benjamin "Ben" Romero (1949–1951)
 Martin Milner/Ken Peters as Friday's partner Los Angeles Police Department (L.A.P.D.) Detective William "Bill" Lockwood (1951)
 Barney Phillips as Friday's partner, Los Angeles Police Department (L.A.P.D) Sergeant Edward "Ed" Jacobs (1952)
 Harry Bartell/Herb Ellis/Vic Perrin/Ben Alexander as Friday's longest serving partner in the entire franchise, Los Angeles Police Department (LAPD) Officer Franklin "Frank" Smith (1952–1959) (Ellis also played Smith in five episodes of the TV series, before being replaced by Alexander, who reprised his role alongside Webb for both the 1954 film and in most of the episodes of the original 1951 television show)
 Charles McGraw/Raymond Burr as Los Angeles Police Department (L.A.P.D.) Chief of Detectives Ed Backstrand. (ep 1–28)
 Tol Avery as Los Angeles Police Department (L.A.P.D.) Chief of Detectives Thaddeus "Thad" Franklin Brown (ep 29+)
 Herb Butterfield as Los Angeles Police Department (L.A.P.D.) Scientific Investigation Division (S.I.D) Crime lab technician Lieutenant Leland "Lee" Jones/Various
 Olan Soule as Los Angeles Police Department (L.A.P.D.) Scientific Investigation Division (S.I.D) Crime lab technician Raymond "Ray" Pinker.
 Peggy Webber as Ma Friday, Joe's Mother/Various.

Other Principal Actors:	Frank Lovejoy, Paul Frees, Ted DeCorsia, Hans Conried, Homer Welch, Parley Baer, Harry Morgan, Betty Lou Gerson, Herb Vigran, Jeff Chandler, William Johnstone, Tony Barrett, William Conrad, Richard Boone, Whitfield Connor, George McCluskey, Stacy Harris, Charles Smith, Eddie Firestone, Virginia Gregg, Ralph Moody, Helen Kleeb, Jack Kruschen, Marion Richman, Martin Milner, Victor Rodman, Inge Jollos, June Whitley, Gil Stratton, Sam Edwards, Joyce McCluskey, Ken Patterson, Gwen Delano, Cliff Arquette, Sarah Selby, Edwin Bruce, Sammy Ogg, June Whitley, Peter Leeds, Lee Marvin, Carolyn Jones, Jean Tatum, Art Gilmore, Paul Richards, Lillian Buyeff, Irene Tedrow, Michael Ann Barrett, Vivi Janiss, Georgia Ellis & Bert Holland.

Episodes

References

Sources
John Dunning, On The Air: The Encyclopedia of Old-Time Radio'', Oxford University Press, 1998, .

External links

Dragnet Radio Show on Old Time Radio Outlaws

Dragnet (franchise)
1949 radio programme debuts
1957 radio programme endings
1940s American radio programs
1950s American radio programs
American radio dramas
Detective radio shows
Radio programs adapted into television shows
Radio programs adapted into comics
Fictional portrayals of the Los Angeles Police Department
NBC radio programs